In Karnataka there are thousands of forts, in Kannada called as  and .

History of Forts of Karnataka
The Forts in Karnataka belong to various dynasties, some of them are more than a thousand years old.

Famous Forts in Karnataka
Basavakalyana Fort

Bellary Fort
Bidar Fort
Chitradurga Fort
Gajendragad Fort
Gulbarga Fort
Kittur Fort
Manjarabad Fort
Mirjan Fort
Mudgal Fort
Raichur Fort
Saundatti Fort

List of Forts in Karnataka

Karnataka has a long history with forts.  In 1294 A.D. the Raichur Fort, built during the reign of Kakatiyas of Warangal, played a major role in the history of Karnataka.  The Krishna-Tungabhadra Doab region witnessed many battles fought to capture and control the fort, several battles involving Vijayanagar kings, Bahmanis and Adilshahis.

Bagalkot District
Aihole Fort
Badami Fort
Bagalkot Fort

Belgaum District
Kittur Fort
Parasgad Fort
Belgaum Fort
Saundatti Fort
Ramdurg Fort
Bailhongal Fort
Hooli Fort
Gokak Fort
Shirasangi Fort
Bhimgad Fort
Vallabhgad Fort
Torgal Fort
Manolli Fort

Bellary District
Sanduru Fort
Bellary Fort
 Tekkalakote Fort
 Malapanagudi Fort
 Kamalapura Fort
 Hampi Fort
Kurugodu Fort
Gudekote fort
Kampli Fort
Biralgudda fort
Jermali Fort

Bengaluru Rural District
Devanahalli Fort
Makalidurga
Kabbaldurga

Bengaluru urban District
Bangalore Fort

Bidar District
Bidar Fort
Basavakalyana Fort
 Bhalki Fort
Manyakheta Fort
Bhatambra Fort
Hankony Fort

Bijapur District
Bijapur Fort
talikote fort
 Kotnal Fort
 Halsangi Fort
 Nagabinal Fort
 Hiremural Fort
 Honahalli Fort

Chikkaballapura District
Skandagiri
Nandi Hill
Gudibanda
Gummanayakana Kote

Chikkamagaluru District
Ballala Raayana Durga Fort

Chitradurga District
Chitradurga Fort
Hosadurga

Dakshina Kannada District
Jamalabad Fort

Davanagere District
 Uchangidurga Fort
Channagiri Fort

Gadag District
Gajendrgad Fort
Korlahalli Fort
Hammigi Fort
Hemagudda Fort
Mundargi Fort
Singatalur Fort
Tippapura Fort
Nargund Fort
Magadi Fort, Gadag
Shrimantgarh Fort, Devihal, Shirahatti

Gulbarga District
Gulbarga Fort
Sedam Fort
Sonty Kullor Fort
Malkhed Fort
Ijeri Fort
Chinmalla Fort
Ferozabad Fort
Modhul Manina Fort
Chengta Fort
Korwar Fort
Martur Fort
Alor B Fort
Hollakonda Fort
shahbad Fort
Hovinhalli Fort

Hassan District
Manjarabad Fort
Nagapura Fort
Shravanabelagola Fort
Halebeedu Fort
Beluru Fort
 Garudanagiri Fort

Haveri District
Bankapura Fort
Savanur Fort
Havanur Fort
Irani Fort

Kodagu District
Madikeri Fort

Kolara District
Ambajidurga
Budikote

Koppal District
Koppal Fort
Anegundi Fort
Kampli Fort
Irakalgada
Kammatadurga

Mandya District
Melkote
Srirangapatna

Raichur District
Raichur Fort (also known as Giridurga)
Mudgal Fort
Malliabad Fort
Jaladurga
Kyadigera Fort
 Hungunta Fort

Ramanagara District
Savandurga
Magadi

Shivamogga District
Kavaledurga Fort
Thirthalli Fort
Kodachadri
Nagara Fort
Kaanuru Fort

Tumkuru District
Huthridurga
Sira 
Huliyurdurga
Pavagada
Madhugiri
Devarayanadurga
Chennarayana Durga
Shivagange
Medigeshi
Bhasmangi
Nidagal Betta

Udupi District
 Barkur Fort
Daria-Bahadurgad Fort
Kapu Fort

Uttara Kannada District
Mirjan Fort
Sadashivgad Fort
Asnoti
Basavaraja Fort
Sanmudageri

Yadagiri District
Vanadurga Fort
Wagingera Fort
Shapur Fort
Yadagiri Fort
Gurumatkal Fort
Chandarki Fort
Surpur Fort

Kolar District
Tekal Fort
Paparajanahalli Fort
Avani Fort
Mulbagal Fort
Virupakshi Fort
 Kurudumale Fort 
 Budikote Fort

See also
Karnataka
North Karnataka

External links
 Mudgal fort
 Chitradurga fort
 Gulbarga fort
 95 stone balls found in Raichur fort
 Raichr region Forts

References

 
History of Karnataka
Karnataka
Forts
Forts